Justice and Development Party Youth (also known as AK Youth) is the youth organization of the Justice and Development Party in Turkey. 

The current chairperson is Ahmet Büyükgümüş.

The youth wing publishes a magazine titled Türkiye Gençlik Bülteni.

References

External links

Justice and Development Party (Turkey)
Youth wings of political parties in Turkey
Youth wings of conservative parties